Microchrysa is a genus of soldierfly belonging to the family Stratiomyidae. There has been some confusion with the synonym Chrysomyia of Macquart, 1834, causing some members of the genus Chrysomya of Robineau-Desvoidy, 1830 to be placed erroneously in this genus.

Species
Microchrysa alessandrinorum Mason, 1997
Microchrysa arabica Hauser, 2008
Microchrysa bicolor (Wiedemann, 1830)
Microchrysa bipars (Walker, 1861)
Microchrysa calopa Brunetti, 1912
Microchrysa calopus Brunetti, 1907
Microchrysa circumscripta Loew, 1857
Microchrysa congoensis Lindner, 1938
Microchrysa cyaneiventris (Zetterstedt, 1842)
Microchrysa daccordii Mason, 1997
Microchrysa deconinckae Mason, 1997
Microchrysa dichoptica James, 1957
Microchrysa dispar Schiner, 1868
Microchrysa edwardsi Lindner, 1939
Microchrysa elmari Lindner, 1960
Microchrysa flavicornis (Meigen, 1822)
Microchrysa flaviventris (Wiedemann, 1824)
Microchrysa flavomarginata Meijere, 1910
Microchrysa fuscistigma Meijere, 1913
Microchrysa ghesquierei Lindner, 1938
Microchrysa inversa Lindner, 1938
Microchrysa japonica Nagatomi, 1975
Microchrysa laodunensis Pleske, 1926
Microchrysa latifrons (Williston, 1900)
Microchrysa loewi Lindner, 1938
Microchrysa macula (Fabricius, 1805)
Microchrysa matengoensis Lindner, 1943
Microchrysa mokanshanensis Ôuchi, 1938
Microchrysa nigrimacula Nagatomi, 1975
Microchrysa nova Giglio-Tos, 1891
Microchrysa obscuriventris McFadden, 1982
Microchrysa polita (Linnaeus, 1758)
Microchrysa rozkosnyi Mason, 1997
Microchrysa ruffoi Mason, 1997
Microchrysa ruwenzoriensis Lindner, 1938
Microchrysa scutellaris Loew, 1857
Microchrysa stuckenbergi Mason, 1997
Microchrysa ussuriana (Pleske, 1930)
Microchrysa vertebrata Lindner, 1955
Microchrysa viridis (Enderlein, 1914)
Microchrysa woodleyi Mason, 1997

References 

Stratiomyidae
Brachycera generaTaxa named by Hermann Loew
Diptera of Africa
Diptera of Asia
Diptera of Europe